The second season of the fantasy drama television series Game of Thrones premiered in the United States on HBO on April 1, 2012, and concluded on June 3, 2012. It consists of 10 episodes, each running approximately 50–60 minutes. The season mostly covers the events of A Clash of Kings, the second novel of the A Song of Ice and Fire series by George R. R. Martin, adapted for television by David Benioff and D. B. Weiss. HBO ordered the second season on April 19, 2011, which began filming in July 2011, primarily in Ireland, Northern Ireland, Croatia and Iceland. 

The story takes place in a fantasy world, primarily on a fictional continent called Westeros, with one storyline occurring on another continent to the east, Essos. Like the novel, the season follows the aftermath of Eddard "Ned" Stark's dramatic death, and the political turmoil that comes with it. The season mainly centers around the War of the Five Kings, fought among the leaders of Westerosi factions who are either staking a claim to the Iron Throne, or seeking independence from it. Cersei Lannister, the widow of the late King Robert Baratheon, stays in the capital as queen regent, while her son Joffrey rules as King of the Seven Kingdoms. Cersei's twin brother, Jaime, is Robb Stark's prisoner, and her other brother, the dwarf Tyrion, serves as Acting Hand of the King to Joffrey, until the siblings' father, Tywin Lannister, returns to help defend the capital. In the North, Jon Snow and the Night's Watch stay with a reluctant ally during an expedition beyond the Wall. Meanwhile, in Essos, with three newborn dragons by her side, Daenerys Targaryen attempts to find allies and resources to help her fulfill her perceived destiny to win the Iron Throne.

Game of Thrones features a large ensemble cast, including Peter Dinklage, Lena Headey, Nikolaj Coster-Waldau, Michelle Fairley and Emilia Clarke. The season introduced a number of new cast members, including Stephen Dillane, Natalie Dormer, Carice van Houten and Liam Cunningham.

Critics praised the show's production values, cast, and music. Viewership rose compared with the previous season. The second season won six of the twelve Emmy Awards for which it was nominated. It received a nomination for Outstanding Supporting Actor in a Drama Series (Peter Dinklage) and Outstanding Drama Series. U.S. viewership rose by approximately 8% over the course of the season, from 3.9 million to 4.2 million by the season finale.

Episodes

Cast

Main cast

Starring 

 Peter Dinklage as Tyrion Lannister
 Lena Headey as Cersei Lannister
 Nikolaj Coster-Waldau as Jaime Lannister
 Michelle Fairley as Catelyn Stark
 Emilia Clarke as Daenerys Targaryen
 Aidan Gillen as Petyr "Littlefinger" Baelish
 Iain Glen as Jorah Mormont
 Kit Harington as Jon Snow
 Liam Cunningham as Davos Seaworth
 Isaac Hempstead Wright as Bran Stark
 Richard Madden as Robb Stark
 Sophie Turner as Sansa Stark
 Maisie Williams as Arya Stark

 Alfie Allen as Theon Greyjoy
 John Bradley as Samwell Tarly
 Jack Gleeson as Joffrey Baratheon
 Rory McCann as Sandor "The Hound" Clegane
 Stephen Dillane as Stannis Baratheon
 Carice van Houten as Melisandre
 James Cosmo as Jeor Mormont
 Jerome Flynn as Bronn
 Conleth Hill as Varys
 Sibel Kekilli as Shae
 Natalie Dormer as Margaery Tyrell
 Charles Dance as Tywin Lannister

Also starring
 Jason Momoa as Khal Drogo

Guest cast
The recurring actors listed here are those who appeared in season 2. They are listed by the region in which they first appear:

At and beyond the Wall
 Simon Armstrong as Qhorin Halfhand
 Ben Crompton as Eddison Tollett
 Mark Stanley as Grenn
 Edward Dogliani as the Lord of Bones
 Rose Leslie as Ygritte
 Robert Pugh as Craster
 Hannah Murray as Gilly
 Ian Whyte & Ross Mullan as White Walkers

In King's Landing
 Callum Wharry as Tommen Baratheon
 Aimee Richardson as Myrcella Baratheon
 Julian Glover as Grand Maester Pycelle
 Dominic Carter as Janos Slynt
 Ian Beattie as Meryn Trant
 Eugene Simon as Lancel Lannister
 Wilko Johnson as Ilyn Payne
 Daniel Portman as Podrick Payne
 Tony Way as Dontos Hollard
 Roy Dotrice as Wisdom Hallyne
 Andrew Wilde as Tobho Mott
 Esmé Bianco as Ros
 Antonia Christophers as Mhaegen
 Sahara Knite as Armeca
 Maisie Dee as Daisy
 Josephine Gillan as Marei

In the Stormlands
 Gethin Anthony as Renly Baratheon
 Gwendoline Christie as Brienne of Tarth
 Finn Jones as Loras Tyrell

On Dragonstone
 Kerr Logan as Matthos Seaworth
 Lucian Msamati as Salladhor Saan
 Oliver Ford Davies as Maester Cressen

On the Iron Islands
 Patrick Malahide as Balon Greyjoy
 Gemma Whelan as Yara Greyjoy
 Ralph Ineson as Dagmer Cleftjaw
 Forbes KB as Black Lorren
 David Coakley as Drennan

In the North
 Art Parkinson as Rickon Stark
 Donald Sumpter as Maester Luwin
 Ron Donachie as Rodrik Cassel
 Peter Ballance as Farlen
 Kristian Nairn as Hodor
 Natalia Tena as Osha

In the Riverlands
 Oona Chaplin as Talisa Maegyr
 Michael McElhatton as Roose Bolton
 John Stahl as Rickard Karstark
 Paul Caddell as Jacks
 Aidan Crowe as Quent
 Tyrone McElhennon as Torrhen Karstark
 Fintan McKeown as Amory Lorch
 Ian Gelder as Kevan Lannister
 Ian Whyte as Gregor Clegane
 Karl Davies as Alton Lannister
 Anthony Morris as the Tickler
 Andy Kellegher as Polliver
 David Fynn as Rennick
 Francis Magee as Yoren
 Joe Dempsie as Gendry
 Ben Hawkey as Hot Pie
 Eros Vlahos as Lommy Greenhands
 Tom Wlaschiha as Jaqen H'ghar
 Andy Beckwith as Rorge
 Gerard Jordan as Biter

In Essos
 Nonso Anozie as Xaro Xhoan Daxos
 Ian Hanmore as Pyat Pree
 Nicholas Blane as the Spice King
 Slavko Juraga as the Silk King
 Laura Pradelska as Quaithe
 Steven Cole as Kovarro
 Elyes Gabel as Rakharo
 Roxanne McKee as Doreah
 Amrita Acharia as Irri

Production
HBO ordered a second season of Game of Thrones on April 19, 2011, two days after the series premiere. The second season obtained a 15% increase in budget in order to be able to stage the war's most important battle, the Battle of the Blackwater, in episode nine.

Filming took place during 106 shooting days. During three-quarters of those, two crews ("Dragon" and "Wolf") were working simultaneously in different locations.

Crew
David Benioff and D. B. Weiss serve as main writers and showrunners for the second season. They co-wrote six out of ten episodes. The remaining four episodes were written by story editor Bryan Cogman, A Song of Ice and Fire author George R. R. Martin, and new series writer and co-executive producer Vanessa Taylor, who wrote two episodes.

Alan Taylor was promoted to co-executive producer and directed four episodes, including the season premiere and finale. David Petrarca and David Nutter each directed two episodes, while series cinematographer Alik Sakharov and filmmaker Neil Marshall directed the remaining two.

Casting
The casting for the second season began in May 2011. Although a large portion of the first-season cast were returning, the producers were still faced with a huge number of new characters to be cast. The producers decided that several characters from A Clash of Kings, including the Freys and Crannogmen Reeds at Winterfell, Frey bannermen of the Starks, the Tullys, Stannis' wife and daughter, Theon's uncle Aeron Greyjoy and the bastard Ramsay Snow would not be cast despite appearing in the novel. Showrunners David Benioff and D. B. Weiss commented on this saying that certain character introductions taking place in A Clash of Kings would be delayed until the third season. This was done due to the large number of characters already introduced in season two, and because they couldn't afford to have people "waiting around" for their characters to become central to the plot. Having to fill so many speaking roles, the showrunners not only "postponed" the introduction of several key characters, but they also merged some into one, or certain plot-functions were given to different characters. Many physical traits were also altered, such as the ethnicity or age of characters. The cast was estimated to be the largest on television. Scattered around two fictional continents characters include, by order of importance:

Emerging as the fourth claimant to the throne is the estranged brother of the late king Robert, Stannis Baratheon (Stephen Dillane). The foreign priestess Melisandre, portrayed by Carice van Houten poses as an influential, yet manipulative advisor to Stannis. Van Houten was previously asked (but unable) to audition for the role of Cersei in season one. While her character retains her signature red robes and hair, unlike in the novels Melisandre is not portrayed as having red eyes, making her appear somewhat more human. Liam Cunningham stars as Ser Davos Seaworth, the "Onion Knight", a bannerman of Stannis and a former smuggler. Cunningham had already been in talks for a role in the first season. As he is left-handed, his Davos has the fingers of the right hand shortened, unlike in the novels where his left hand is crippled. In an interview, Cunningham said that a lot of new dialogue had to be written for his character, because in the novels Davos, a point-of-view character, is portrayed more through his thoughts than through his actions. These three characters headed a new storyline set on a different location, that by the end of the season merged with the main plot.

Theon Greyjoy (Alfie Allen), a main cast member from the first season, but with lesser importance than the others, came to prominence during the second season, as his story unfolded and his character became more central. Gemma Whelan appeared as his sister, Yara Greyjoy. Named "Asha" in the novels, the character's name was changed to avoid confusion with the Wildling Osha, Bran Stark's companion. "Asha" is portrayed as a fairly provocative and independent woman, a captain of thirty ships, as opposed to her television counterpart Yara, who did not retain "Asha's" traits, although her rivalry with Theon remained intact. Their father Balon Greyjoy was played by Patrick Malahide. Many of the characters involved in the Greyjoys' storyline weren't introduced, most notably Balon's brother Aeron Greyjoy. Nonetheless, the storyline received enormous praise, with the alteration of Yara's name and persona being the only criticism.

Tom Wlaschiha is cast as Jaqen H'ghar, a mysterious prisoner who develops a murderous relationship with young Arya Stark (Maisie Williams). Wlaschiha's pronunciation of his character's name, Jack-in, was adopted for use in the show. Natalie Dormer, best known for her portrayal as seductive Anne Boleyn in Showtime's The Tudors, was cast in a similar role as Margaery Tyrell, a noblewoman and the wife of the third claimant to the throne, Renly Baratheon. Gwendoline Christie played, to much praise, Brienne of Tarth, a female warrior who joins Renly Baratheon's guard, but later becomes a follower of Catelyn Stark. To prepare for the role, Christie took up an intense training regimen, adding over a stone (6.4 kg) of muscle mass. So that she could be mistaken for a man, her armor was decorated with lines that slant away from her hips. On the other side of the fictional world, two female roles with rising prominence were added to the cast: Skins star Hannah Murray filled the role of Craster's daughter Gilly, a love interest to Samwell Tarly; while the second role, the one of Ygritte, Jon Snow's love interest among the Wildlings, was played by Rose Leslie.

Daenerys Targaryen's (Emilia Clarke) stay at Qarth, opened the way for several recurring characters. Nonso Anozie played Daenerys's host at Qarth, Xaro Xhoan Daxos. The character differed a lot from his novel counterpart. Xaro's homosexuality, femininity and caucasian origin were overshadowed by dark skinned Anozie's masculinity and heterosexuality. Acting as one of her suitors is the treacherous warlock Pyat Pree portrayed by Ian Hanmore. Her third and final suitor was the masked priestess Quaithe (Laura Pradelska). Specially created for the television series was the so-called "Spice King", a rich merchant from Qarth, played by Nicholas Blane. Also an original creation of the show is the character of Talisa (Oona Chaplin), a healer from Volantis and a romantic interest for Robb. She fills the role of another female interest of Robb's, called Jeyne Westerling, who has no similarities with Talisa whatsoever. In addition to Talisa, Michael McElhatton joins the cast in the role of Roose Bolton, an important character in Robb Stark's storyline. Lastly, Simon Armstrong plays the legendary Night's Watch ranger Qhorin Halfhand.

Others were also added to the cast, either in a small recurring role or with reduced prominence. The most notable example is Tony Way's Ser Dontos Hollard, a drunkard knight, who had a pivotal role in Sansa Stark's storyline that ran in the course of two novels, while in the series the role was reduced to a small scene in the opening episode. Others include: Ben Crompton as "Dolorous Edd" Tollet, a man of the Night's Watch. Robert Pugh as the Wildling Craster, father and husband to Gilly. Kerr Logan as Davos Seaworth's pious son Matthos.
Karl Davies as Ser Alton Lannister, a character created for the series who replaces Cleos Frey as envoy from the Starks to the Lannisters. Daniel Portman took the role of Podrick Payne, the squire to Tyrion Lannister. The 19-year-old Portman plays Podrick as about 16 years old, instead of about 12 as in the novels. To be able to portray Podrick as awkward, shy and weak, Portman, previously a sportsman, stopped his fitness regimen and gained some weight to appear more endearing. Lucian Msamati played Salladhor Saan, a Lysene pirate and friend of Davos Seaworth. Finally, Edward Dogliani appeared briefly as the "Lord of Bones" (or "Rattleshirt" in the novels), a Wildling leader and Oliver Ford Davies as Stannis's maester Cressen.

All of the recurring characters from the first season returned, with one notable exception: Conan Stevens, whose role of Gregor Clegane was recast with Ian Whyte, did not return. Roy Dotrice, a friend of George R. R. Martin, known for reading the audio versions of the novels and having previously rejected a role due to health reasons, appears this season as Pyromancer Hallyne, an elderly alchemist at King's Landing.

Locations

For the second season, the city of Dubrovnik, Croatia, was used instead of Malta for scenes in King's Landing and Daenerys' scenes in Qarth. For example, the Minčeta Tower in Dubrovnik was used as the House of the Undying. Scenes set north of the Wall were filmed in Iceland in November 2011. The main locations are the Vatnajökull glacier, the Svínafellsjökull glacier near Skaftafell, and the Mýrdalsjökull glacier near Vik used as the location for the Fist of the First Men with Höfðabrekka as the Frostfang Mountains. New shooting locations in Northern Ireland include The Linen Mill Film & Television Studios in Banbridge, Ballintoy Harbour and Downhill Strand. As the story in the second season required that the Winterfell set be expanded, a new set for Winterfell was built at the Moneyglass Estate near Toome village.

Music

The music for the second season was again composed by Ramin Djawadi. It contains a rendition of a song often mentioned or sung in the novels, The Rains of Castamere, by the indie rock band The National.

The soundtrack for the season was released on June 19, 2012.

Promotion
HBO released numerous teaser trailers for the second season, beginning on December 11, 2011. The second trailer, published on January 29, 2012, was viewed 3.5 million times in the first three days after publication, a record for HBO promotional content. Other trailers were released on February 24, March 3 (set to Florence and the Machine's Seven Devils) as well as subsequently.

HBO also published other promotional material, such as cast photographs and teaser posters, prior to the airing of the first episode. The second issue of Entertainment Weekly in March 2012 had four alternative covers dedicated to in-costume photographs of Peter Dinklage (Tyrion), Emilia Clarke (Daenerys), Kit Harington (Jon Snow) or Nikolaj Coster-Waldau and Lena Headey (Jaime and Cersei Lannister).

Reception

Pre-release 
Thanks to the critical and commercial success of the first season, as well as HBO's marketing efforts, the second season received intensive media coverage well before it started airing. Sunday is Coming, a two-minute short film for Funny or Die, satirized viewers' excitement about the return of Game of Thrones. Several media outlets reviewed the season's first four episodes before they were broadcast, and rendered almost uniformly positive verdicts.

Critical response 

Several media outlets reviewed the season's first four episodes before they were broadcast, and rendered almost uniformly positive verdicts. The season holds a Metacritic score of 90 out of 100 based on 26 critics, indicating "universal acclaim". On Rotten Tomatoes, the second season has a 96% approval rating from 37 critics with an average rating of 8.89 out of 10. The site's critical consensus reads, "Game of Thrones follows up a strong debut with an even better second season, combining elegant storytelling and vivid characters to create a rich fantasy world." 

Brian Lowry of Variety gave the season a positive review and stated, "Thrones creates such a rich visual feast - replete with plenty of gratuitous nudity and blood-letting - as to almost obscure its fundamental storytelling pleasures, which are as much a mob drama as anything else, having traded bullets for broadswords." Nancy deWolf Smith of The Wall Street Journal said that "each week the story unfolds like a tapestry, its intricate stitches slowly creating not just a scene but a whole world." Slant Magazine gave the season 3 out of 4 and stated, "[Game Of Thrones] Season Two must be admired for its gripping presentation of splintered families and unwavering ruthlessness." Emily Nussbaum of The New Yorker gave the season a positive review and stated, "Game of Thrones is the latest entry in television's most esteemed category: the sophisticated cable drama about a patriarchal subculture." Matt Zoller Seitz of Vulture positively spoke about the season that "what's onscreen is so consistently remarkable, and so much smarter than it needed to be in order to satisfy viewers who are mainly looking for sex, violence, and intrigue, that the show's presence feels like a kind of miracle."

David Wiegand of the San Francisco Chronicle its "compelling, murderous and sexy characters". The New York Post stated, "Even though I get so confused my head feels like it's going to explode, Game of Thrones is brainy, good fun." Newsday gave it a score of 'A+' and said that it was "TV's best (but do your homework before diving in)." Ken Tucker of Entertainment Weekly gave it a score of 'A−', who praised its storytelling to be "so vivid, so vital, and just plain fun." Maureen Ryan of HuffPost gave the season a positive review and stated, "It's gratifying to be able to say that the first four hours of Season 2 of Game of Thrones are far more elegant and engaging." Andy Greenwald of Grantland praised its ambition and scope, while James Poniewozik of Time found the premiere episode to be "hustling off steadily and confidently." Peter Dinklage's portrayal of Tyrion Lannister was acclaimed by William Thomas of Empire, who gave it a score of 5 out of 5.

The only major publication to give the season a negative review was Neil Genzlinger of The New York Times, who stated, "You have to have a fair amount of free time on your hands to stick with Game of Thrones, and a fairly low reward threshold."

Ratings

Accolades

The second season was nominated for 12 Primetime Emmy Awards, which included Outstanding Drama Series and Outstanding Supporting Actor in a Drama Series for Peter Dinklage. It won six awards, for,  Outstanding Costumes for a Series, Outstanding Art Direction for a Single-Camera Series,  Outstanding Makeup for a Single-Camera Series (Non-Prosthetic),  Outstanding Sound Editing for a Series, Outstanding Sound Mixing for a Comedy or Drama Series (One-Hour), and Outstanding Special Visual Effects.

Release

Broadcast
The second season of Game of Thrones was broadcast on HBO in the United States from April 1, 2012 to June 3, 2012.

Home media
DVD/Blu-ray box sets and digital downloads of the second season were released in North America on February 19, 2013. The DVD set contains a 30-minute feature covering the production of the episode "Blackwater", actor interviews, character profiles, twelve audio commentaries by cast and crew, and a discussion about Westerosi religions by the showrunners and George R. R. Martin. The Blu-ray set additionally contains a feature about the "War of the Five Kings" that breaks out in season two, as well as 19 animated histories of the mythology of Westeros and Essos.

Copyright infringement
The second season of Game of Thrones was the most-pirated TV series in 2012.

References

External links 
  – official US site
  – official UK site
 Game of Thrones – The Viewers Guide on HBO.com
 Making Game of Thrones on HBO.com
 
 

Season 2
2012 American television seasons